The Islamic Azad University, Mashhad Branch (IAUM), also known as the Islamic Azad University of Mashhad, is a private university in Mashhad, Iran. This university is a branch of the Islamic Azad University. It was established in 1982 and offers Bachelor, Masters, PhD and M.D. degrees. It is famous for the quality and rigour of its undergraduate education and the success of its students in many national competitions and exams.

About

The Islamic Azad University, Mashhad Branch is one of the main and earliest branches of the Islamic Azad University. IAU is a private university system with a total of over 350 branches around Iran, and five branches overseas. IAUM was established in December 1982, in response to the high demand for higher education following the Islamic Revolution. The institution receives no financial aid from the government. It is entirely self-financed by student fees and is run by a board of trustees. Each one of the Islamic Azad University's branches is a comprehensive university in its own right with many faculties and offers various degrees up to the PhD level. This branch became one of the Comprehensive units in July 2000 and in the second general assembly of the International Association of University, and the Federation of the Universities of the Islamic World, April 2001 Koualalampur, Malaysia, became one of its active members.

IAUM has over 547 academic staff and about 25,936 students. 124 subjects are taught in six major programs (medical science, science, humanities, engineering, agriculture, art and architecture) at four different levels (undergraduate, graduate, Masters and PhD). More than 60,000 students have graduated from IAUM. It is run by more than 1756 administrative staff, most of whom have graduate and postgraduate degrees.

Faculties

 Medicine faculty
 Basic sciences faculty
 College of Basic Sciences
 College of Law, Political sciences & Foreign Languages
 College of Humanities & Management
 School of Medicine
 School of Architecture & Art (architecture, Urban Planning, industrial design)
 School of Sport Sciences

Medicine faculty
The medicine faculty has an Educational space of 6000 square meters 138 with 8 classrooms with audiovisual facilities, an amphitheatre, educational laboratories, a computer and IT centre and pratic, moulage and anatomy halls. 
There are 7 laboratories in the faculty: Histology, Pathology, Parasitology and Mycology, Microbiology, Physiology and Biochemistry.

Facilities of basic sciences faculty

The faculty educational Space

Since the beginning, the faculty's educational and official space has been located in Mashhad, Rahnamaee street, and two other buildings have been used in Rahnamaee and Sanabad street. Now the sciences faculty with 6420 square meters built area in 4 buildings accepts students.

A major part of the space is occupied with classrooms, audio classes or educational workshops. The faculty has 32 classrooms now.

The faculty library

The library of the basic sciences faculty with 444 square meters of space is located in the south corner of the faculty and includes a book storehouse, awarding part, reference part, issues parts, technical part and male and female studying halls.

The references organization system is based on LC classification which is managed on the basis of the university libraries technical services. Now, all of the faculty members, the sciences faculty students and personnel are permanent members of the library. According to the topics of IAUM libraries, every student has been able to use every library of the university, which is very good for students in accessing to update references and research.  Therefore, permanent and variant members of the library are more than 21,000 persons.

Kharazmi research Center

This centre, with the goal of research activities harmonization in orientations of the centre interdisciplinary, was recommended in 2007 and the implementation is in progress. The research laboratories complex of the centre includes nanotechnology research, chemistry, biochemistry physic, geology, physic, mathematic and statistic laboratories.
hall

Facilities of Engineering Faculty

Library

 The separated libraries are located in every building of the faculty 3 studying halls in the main building and 2 in building NO.2
 Having 23,500 volumes of Persian book, 8500 volumes of Latin book, 50 titles Persian journal, 30 titles Latin journal and 710 Persian theses
 Open and close bookcase and classification is on the basis of congress classification

Membership in the magazines and electronic database

In order for the students to access the newest and the most updated essays and information of the world, the faculty has managed to get the membership of some magazines and electronic databases so that the students can connect to these sites through the internet and search and receive the essays freely.

Amphitheater and Auditorium

The faculty has two spaces with about 400 square meters area and also with a totally 350 persons capacity for holding different ceremonies and conferences. These halls are most used, in different ways, for performing these defence and students projects, holding miscellaneous classes and educational workshops and also in order to hold gatherings and conferences.

Mechanized system

The students of Technical and Engineering faculty conduct all their affairs related to educational and financial and other student issue areas such as course selection, omission and addition, education engagement deposition and grades receiving and report card through the internet. Performing financial affairs and food reservations is done through the internet and in a mechanized manner. In this regard, in the course selection time and also in omission and addition time, the place is being used by the students freely.

Cafeteria and self-service

Among other welfare facilities in the Technical and Engineering Faculty are cafeteria and self-service halls for use of all students. On the north side of the faculty, appropriate space on three floors, in an area of more than 3000 square meters, is allocated as the faculty cafeteria and self-service.

Communication services

For the students' comfort, several buses are devoted, in the student high traffic routes of the students throughout Mashhad, to transfer the students to the faculty and vice versa. The services during the week (except holidays) and during the term commute almost every hour in these routes. Students' reception of these services is noticeable.

Facilities of Law, Political Sciences and Foreign  Languages Faculty

There are 17 classrooms.

Doctor Sheykholeslami (Department of Law), Doctor Modirshanehchi (Department of Political Science) and Doctor Mohammad Javad Kamali (Founder of the French Department) are the most famous professors of this faculty.

Library of faculty

There are 26,000 books in law, political sciences, English and French. 18,000 of them are in Persian and 8,000 are in English and French. This library is also a member of 15 scientific journals. In this library, there are a CD bank, educational video cassettes and two studying halls for male and female students.

Facilities of Paramedical Faculty

Educational classrooms and audio-vision facilities

This faculty has 5 educational classrooms with a capacity of 85  students.

The libraryparamedical1

The library of Para Medical Faculty was established in 2003 in a limited space with about 60 volumes of books n the location of the faculty. Now, some of the references include about 5270 Persian and Latin books which are classified with the congress library method and also has 240 Persian and Latin magazines. The present area of the faculty's library is 110 square meters, including store and male and female studying halls.

Dynamic site

In the faculty site with the address of http://pmd.mshdiau.ac.ir, the latest news and information about the educational departments of the faculty are accessible by the students and professors and become updated regularly.

On the main page of the site, information of the educational departments, faculty members, regulations, conferences and gatherings, educational calendar, the introduction of the faculty, facilities and officials of  Para Medical Faculty are in access of the public.

IAUMg, Student Association of IAUM
Student Association of IAUM (Islamic Azad University of Mashhad) which is called "IAUMg", Dependent on KAVA Academic Center, has begun its activity in summer 2009.
IAUMg has been approved by IAUM Public relations (iaumnews.ir) and Cultural Deputy of University (License Number: 31395/d).

References

Educational institutions established in 1982
Mashhad
Buildings and structures in Mashhad
Education in Razavi Khorasan Province
1982 establishments in Iran